Ray Morgan may refer to:
 Ray Morgan (baseball), American baseball player
 Ray Morgan (announcer), American radio and television announcer
 Ray Morgan (curler), American curler

See also
 Raymond C. Morgan, American football and basketball coach
 Raymar Morgan, American basketball player